Newcastle Airport may refer to:
 Newcastle International Airport, an airport in Newcastle upon Tyne, England, UK
 Newcastle Airport metro station, the Tyne and Wear metro station serving the airport
 Newcastle Airport (Nevis), now Vance W. Amory International Airport, an airport in Charlestown, Saint Kitts and Nevis
 Newcastle Airport (New South Wales), an airport in Williamtown, New South Wales, Australia
 Newcastle Airport (South Africa), an airport in Newcastle, South Africa
 Newcastle Aerodrome, an airport in the Republic of Ireland

See also 
 New Castle Airport (disambiguation)
 RAAF Base Williamtown, a military airbase near Newcastle, New South Wales